Pseudoelasticity, sometimes called superelasticity, is an elastic (reversible) response to an applied stress, caused by a phase transformation between the austenitic and martensitic phases of a crystal.  It is exhibited in shape-memory alloys.

Overview 
Pseudoelasticity is from the reversible motion of domain boundaries during the phase transformation, rather than just bond stretching or the introduction of defects in the crystal lattice (thus it is not true superelasticity but rather pseudoelasticity).  Even if the domain boundaries do become pinned, they may be reversed through heating.  Thus, a pseudoelastic material may return to its previous shape (hence, shape memory) after the removal of even relatively high applied strains.  One special case of pseudoelasticity is called the Bain Correspondence.  This involves the austenite/martensite phase transformation between a face-centered crystal lattice (FCC) and a body-centered tetragonal crystal structure (BCT).

Superelastic alloys belong to the larger family of shape-memory alloys. When mechanically loaded, a superelastic alloy deforms reversibly to very high strains (up to 10%) by the creation of a stress-induced phase. When the load is removed, the new phase becomes unstable and the material regains its original shape. Unlike shape-memory alloys, no change in temperature is needed for the alloy to recover its initial shape.

Superelastic devices take advantage of their large, reversible deformation and include antennas, eyeglass frames, and biomedical stents.

Nickel titanium (Nitinol) is an example of an alloy exhibiting superelasticity.

Size effects 
Recently, there have been interests of discovering materials exhibiting superelasticity in nanoscale for MEMS (Microelectromechanical systems) application. The ability to control the martensitic phase transformation has already been reported. But the behavior of superelasticity has been observed to have size effects in nanoscale.

Qualitatively speaking, superelasticity is the reversible deformation by phase transformation. Therefore, it competes with the irreversible plastic deformation by dislocation motion. At nanoscale, the dislocation density and possible Frank–Read source sites are greatly reduced, so the yield stress is increased with reduced size. Therefore, for materials exhibiting superelasticity behavior in nanoscale, it has been found that they can operate in long-term cycling with little detrimental evolution. On the other hand, the critical stress for martensitic phase transformation to occur is also increased because of the reduced possible sites for nucleation to begin. Nucleation usually begins near dislocation or at surface defects. But for nanoscale materials, the dislocation density is greatly reduced, and the surface is usually atomically smooth. Therefore, the phase transformation of nanoscale materials exhibiting superelasticity is usually found to be homogeneous, resulting in much higher critical stress. Specifically, for Zirconia, where it has three phases, the competition between phase transformation and plastic deformation has been found to be orientation dependent, indicating the orientation dependence of activation energy of dislocation and nucleation. Therefore, for nanoscale materials suitable for superelasticity, one should research on the optimized crystal orientation and surface roughness for most enhanced superelasticity effect.

See also 
Shape-memory alloy
Elasticity (physics)

References

External links
 DoITPoMS Teaching and Learning Package: "Superelasticity and Shape Memory Alloys"

Materials science